The 1932 VFL season was the 36th season of the Victorian Football League (VFL), the highest level senior Australian rules football competition in Victoria. The season featured twelve clubs, ran from 30 April until 1 October, and comprised an 18-game home-and-away season followed by a finals series featuring the top four clubs.

The premiership was won by the Richmond Football Club for the third time, after it defeated  by nine points in the 1932 VFL Grand Final.

Premiership season
In 1932, the VFL competition consisted of twelve teams of 18 on-the-field players each, plus one substitute player, known as the 19th man. A player could be substituted for any reason; however, once substituted, a player could not return to the field of play under any circumstances.

Teams played each other in a home-and-away season of 18 rounds; matches 12 to 18 were the "home-and-way reverse" of matches 1 to 7.

Once the 18 round home-and-away season had finished, the 1932 VFL Premiers were determined by the specific format and conventions of the Page–McIntyre system.

Round 1

|-
! Home team
! Home team score
! Away team
! Away team score
! Venue
! Crowd
! Date
|- bgcolor="#FFFFFF"
| 
| 16.20 (116)
| 
| 6.14 (50)
| Punt Road Oval
| 25,000
| 30 April 1932
|- bgcolor="#FFFFFF"
| 
| 14.21 (105)
| 
| 11.12 (78)
| Corio Oval
| 13,000
| 30 April 1932
|- bgcolor="#FFFFFF"
| 
| 15.15 (105)
| 
| 7.12 (54)
| Windy Hill
| 30,000
| 30 April 1932
|- bgcolor="#FFFFFF"
| 
| 11.19 (85)
| 
| 9.11 (65)
| Lake Oval
| 17,500
| 30 April 1932
|- bgcolor="#FFFFFF"
| 
| 7.9 (51)
| 
| 11.10 (76)
| Glenferrie Oval
| 14,500
| 30 April 1932
|- bgcolor="#FFFFFF"
| 
| 12.19 (91)
| 
| 10.15 (75)
| Brunswick Street Oval
| 25,000
| 30 April 1932

Round 2

|-
! Home team
! Home team score
! Away team
! Away team score
! Venue
! Crowd
! Date
|- bgcolor="#FFFFFF"
| 
| 12.11 (83)
| 
| 13.16 (94)
| Victoria Park
| 18,000
| 7 May 1932
|- bgcolor="#FFFFFF"
| 
| 10.15 (75)
| 
| 17.11 (113)
| Princes Park
| 28,000
| 7 May 1932
|- bgcolor="#FFFFFF"
| 
| 16.19 (115)
| 
| 11.16 (82)
| Junction Oval
| 13,000
| 7 May 1932
|- bgcolor="#FFFFFF"
| 
| 14.11 (95)
| 
| 7.10 (52)
| Western Oval
| 21,500
| 7 May 1932
|- bgcolor="#FFFFFF"
| 
| 14.12 (96)
| 
| 16.17 (113)
| Arden Street Oval
| 15,000
| 7 May 1932
|- bgcolor="#FFFFFF"
| 
| 7.13 (55)
| 
| 15.26 (116)
| Motordrome
| 13,000
| 7 May 1932

Round 3

|-
! Home team
! Home team score
! Away team
! Away team score
! Venue
! Crowd
! Date
|- bgcolor="#FFFFFF"
| 
| 8.11 (59)
| 
| 6.14 (50)
| Glenferrie Oval
| 8,000
| 14 May 1932
|- bgcolor="#FFFFFF"
| 
| 25.10 (160)
| 
| 6.9 (45)
| Corio Oval
| 10,500
| 14 May 1932
|- bgcolor="#FFFFFF"
| 
| 13.16 (94)
| 
| 17.11 (113)
| Brunswick Street Oval
| 15,000
| 14 May 1932
|- bgcolor="#FFFFFF"
| 
| 10.11 (71)
| 
| 8.12 (60)
| Lake Oval
| 30,000
| 14 May 1932
|- bgcolor="#FFFFFF"
| 
| 15.20 (110)
| 
| 18.11 (119)
| Windy Hill
| 18,000
| 14 May 1932
|- bgcolor="#FFFFFF"
| 
| 10.23 (83)
| 
| 12.12 (84)
| Punt Road Oval
| 24,500
| 14 May 1932

Round 4

|-
! Home team
! Home team score
! Away team
! Away team score
! Venue
! Crowd
! Date
|- bgcolor="#FFFFFF"
| 
| 9.16 (70)
| 
| 11.7 (73)
| Arden Street Oval
| 23,000
| 21 May 1932
|- bgcolor="#FFFFFF"
| 
| 6.12 (48)
| 
| 7.9 (51)
| Western Oval
| 19,000
| 21 May 1932
|- bgcolor="#FFFFFF"
| 
| 14.22 (106)
| 
| 11.9 (75)
| Victoria Park
| 17,000
| 21 May 1932
|- bgcolor="#FFFFFF"
| 
| 16.16 (112)
| 
| 7.7 (49)
| Princes Park
| 16,000
| 21 May 1932
|- bgcolor="#FFFFFF"
| 
| 7.15 (57)
| 
| 12.15 (87)
| Junction Oval
| 16,000
| 21 May 1932
|- bgcolor="#FFFFFF"
| 
| 20.13 (133)
| 
| 14.11 (95)
| Motordrome
| 7,000
| 21 May 1932

Round 5

|-
! Home team
! Home team score
! Away team
! Away team score
! Venue
! Crowd
! Date
|- bgcolor="#FFFFFF"
| 
| 13.14 (92)
| 
| 8.10 (58)
| Western Oval
| 14,000
| 28 May 1932
|- bgcolor="#FFFFFF"
| 
| 12.6 (78)
| 
| 20.10 (130)
| Brunswick Street Oval
| 13,000
| 28 May 1932
|- bgcolor="#FFFFFF"
| 
| 13.15 (93)
| 
| 11.7 (73)
| Princes Park
| 32,000
| 28 May 1932
|- bgcolor="#FFFFFF"
| 
| 18.10 (118)
| 
| 12.16 (88)
| Arden Street Oval
| 12,000
| 28 May 1932
|- bgcolor="#FFFFFF"
| 
| 13.18 (96)
| 
| 6.9 (45)
| Punt Road Oval
| 10,000
| 28 May 1932
|- bgcolor="#FFFFFF"
| 
| 14.15 (99)
| 
| 9.11 (65)
| Lake Oval
| 28,000
| 28 May 1932

Round 6

|-
! Home team
! Home team score
! Away team
! Away team score
! Venue
! Crowd
! Date
|- bgcolor="#FFFFFF"
| 
| 11.14 (80)
| 
| 16.13 (109)
| Glenferrie Oval
| 12,000
| 4 June 1932
|- bgcolor="#FFFFFF"
| 
| 9.15 (69)
| 
| 9.15 (69)
| Corio Oval
| 17,000
| 4 June 1932
|- bgcolor="#FFFFFF"
| 
| 22.10 (142)
| 
| 13.12 (90)
| Windy Hill
| 15,000
| 4 June 1932
|- bgcolor="#FFFFFF"
| 
| 12.19 (91)
| 
| 9.21 (75)
| Victoria Park
| 25,000
| 4 June 1932
|- bgcolor="#FFFFFF"
| 
| 16.9 (105)
| 
| 16.14 (110)
| Junction Oval
| 13,000
| 4 June 1932
|- bgcolor="#FFFFFF"
| 
| 12.15 (87)
| 
| 9.9 (63)
| Motordrome
| 12,500
| 4 June 1932

Round 7

|-
! Home team
! Home team score
! Away team
! Away team score
! Venue
! Crowd
! Date
|- bgcolor="#FFFFFF"
| 
| 16.5 (101)
| 
| 11.17 (83)
| Victoria Park
| 7,000
| 18 June 1932
|- bgcolor="#FFFFFF"
| 
| 17.16 (118)
| 
| 7.12 (54)
| Princes Park
| 15,000
| 18 June 1932
|- bgcolor="#FFFFFF"
| 
| 14.21 (105)
| 
| 14.12 (96)
| Lake Oval
| 38,000
| 18 June 1932
|- bgcolor="#FFFFFF"
| 
| 9.8 (62)
| 
| 13.13 (91)
| Arden Street Oval
| 18,000
| 18 June 1932
|- bgcolor="#FFFFFF"
| 
| 14.16 (100)
| 
| 8.13 (61)
| Punt Road Oval
| 13,000
| 18 June 1932
|- bgcolor="#FFFFFF"
| 
| 7.9 (51)
| 
| 8.17 (65)
| Glenferrie Oval
| 7,000
| 18 June 1932

Round 8

|-
! Home team
! Home team score
! Away team
! Away team score
! Venue
! Crowd
! Date
|- bgcolor="#FFFFFF"
| 
| 8.7 (55)
| 
| 8.9 (57)
| Punt Road Oval
| 35,000
| 25 June 1932
|- bgcolor="#FFFFFF"
| 
| 10.7 (67)
| 
| 3.9 (27)
| Western Oval
| 10,000
| 25 June 1932
|- bgcolor="#FFFFFF"
| 
| 13.15 (93)
| 
| 9.9 (63)
| Brunswick Street Oval
| 7,500
| 25 June 1932
|- bgcolor="#FFFFFF"
| 
| 9.9 (63)
| 
| 11.12 (78)
| Corio Oval
| 9,500
| 25 June 1932
|- bgcolor="#FFFFFF"
| 
| 12.16 (88)
| 
| 15.15 (105)
| Junction Oval
| 9,000
| 25 June 1932
|- bgcolor="#FFFFFF"
| 
| 11.7 (73)
| 
| 14.16 (100)
| Arden Street Oval
| 15,000
| 25 June 1932

Round 9

|-
! Home team
! Home team score
! Away team
! Away team score
! Venue
! Crowd
! Date
|- bgcolor="#FFFFFF"
| 
| 12.13 (85)
| 
| 10.14 (74)
| MCG
| 9,747
| 2 July 1932
|- bgcolor="#FFFFFF"
| 
| 4.18 (42)
| 
| 11.14 (80)
| Windy Hill
| 20,000
| 2 July 1932
|- bgcolor="#FFFFFF"
| 
| 19.12 (126)
| 
| 13.9 (87)
| Victoria Park
| 10,500
| 2 July 1932
|- bgcolor="#FFFFFF"
| 
| 9.21 (75)
| 
| 7.9 (51)
| Princes Park
| 23,000
| 2 July 1932
|- bgcolor="#FFFFFF"
| 
| 7.12 (54)
| 
| 14.11 (95)
| Glenferrie Oval
| 5,500
| 2 July 1932
|- bgcolor="#FFFFFF"
| 
| 12.10 (82)
| 
| 10.15 (75)
| Lake Oval
| 16,000
| 2 July 1932

Round 10

|-
! Home team
! Home team score
! Away team
! Away team score
! Venue
! Crowd
! Date
|- bgcolor="#FFFFFF"
| 
| 10.9 (69)
| 
| 9.16 (70)
| Junction Oval
| 13,000
| 9 July 1932
|- bgcolor="#FFFFFF"
| 
| 7.15 (57)
| 
| 8.8 (56)
| Western Oval
| 9,500
| 9 July 1932
|- bgcolor="#FFFFFF"
| 
| 14.6 (90)
| 
| 11.12 (78)
| Victoria Park
| 20,000
| 9 July 1932
|- bgcolor="#FFFFFF"
| 
| 21.16 (142)
| 
| 11.11 (77)
| Princes Park
| 15,000
| 9 July 1932
|- bgcolor="#FFFFFF"
| 
| 14.22 (106)
| 
| 8.11 (59)
| Arden Street Oval
| 6,000
| 9 July 1932
|- bgcolor="#FFFFFF"
| 
| 15.12 (102)
| 
| 13.12 (90)
| MCG
| 9,807
| 9 July 1932

Round 11

|-
! Home team
! Home team score
! Away team
! Away team score
! Venue
! Crowd
! Date
|- bgcolor="#FFFFFF"
| 
| 11.6 (72)
| 
| 10.13 (73)
| Brunswick Street Oval
| 10,000
| 16 July 1932
|- bgcolor="#FFFFFF"
| 
| 6.14 (50)
| 
| 7.11 (53)
| Windy Hill
| 10,000
| 16 July 1932
|- bgcolor="#FFFFFF"
| 
| 8.10 (58)
| 
| 6.7 (43)
| Punt Road Oval
| 11,500
| 16 July 1932
|- bgcolor="#FFFFFF"
| 
| 9.9 (63)
| 
| 6.6 (42)
| Glenferrie Oval
| 7,500
| 16 July 1932
|- bgcolor="#FFFFFF"
| 
| 5.17 (47)
| 
| 7.8 (50)
| Lake Oval
| 38,000
| 16 July 1932
|- bgcolor="#FFFFFF"
| 
| 8.20 (68)
| 
| 10.23 (83)
| Corio Oval
| 14,000
| 16 July 1932

Round 12

|-
! Home team
! Home team score
! Away team
! Away team score
! Venue
! Crowd
! Date
|- bgcolor="#FFFFFF"
| 
| 12.12 (84)
| 
| 13.15 (93)
| MCG
| 20,283
| 23 July 1932
|- bgcolor="#FFFFFF"
| 
| 14.10 (94)
| 
| 10.10 (70)
| Victoria Park
| 9,000
| 23 July 1932
|- bgcolor="#FFFFFF"
| 
| 18.21 (129)
| 
| 13.6 (84)
| Princes Park
| 20,000
| 23 July 1932
|- bgcolor="#FFFFFF"
| 
| 7.12 (54)
| 
| 12.13 (85)
| Junction Oval
| 18,000
| 23 July 1932
|- bgcolor="#FFFFFF"
| 
| 6.14 (50)
| 
| 14.10 (94)
| Arden Street Oval
| 12,000
| 23 July 1932
|- bgcolor="#FFFFFF"
| 
| 11.16 (82)
| 
| 10.9 (69)
| Western Oval
| 14,000
| 23 July 1932

Round 13

|-
! Home team
! Home team score
! Away team
! Away team score
! Venue
! Crowd
! Date
|- bgcolor="#FFFFFF"
| 
| 8.13 (61)
| 
| 7.8 (50)
| Glenferrie Oval
| 6,000
| 30 July 1932
|- bgcolor="#FFFFFF"
| 
| 6.13 (49)
| 
| 10.14 (74)
| Brunswick Street Oval
| 10,000
| 30 July 1932
|- bgcolor="#FFFFFF"
| 
| 14.14 (98)
| 
| 15.2 (92)
| Windy Hill
| 9,000
| 30 July 1932
|- bgcolor="#FFFFFF"
| 
| 12.18 (90)
| 
| 10.6 (66)
| Punt Road Oval
| 11,000
| 30 July 1932
|- bgcolor="#FFFFFF"
| 
| 13.17 (95)
| 
| 10.10 (70)
| Corio Oval
| 11,000
| 30 July 1932
|- bgcolor="#FFFFFF"
| 
| 11.14 (80)
| 
| 12.17 (89)
| Lake Oval
| 41,000
| 30 July 1932

Round 14

|-
! Home team
! Home team score
! Away team
! Away team score
! Venue
! Crowd
! Date
|- bgcolor="#FFFFFF"
| 
| 11.14 (80)
| 
| 9.14 (68)
| Western Oval
| 18,000
| 6 August 1932
|- bgcolor="#FFFFFF"
| 
| 14.15 (99)
| 
| 9.13 (67)
| Victoria Park
| 10,000
| 6 August 1932
|- bgcolor="#FFFFFF"
| 
| 12.14 (86)
| 
| 13.13 (91)
| Princes Park
| 31,000
| 6 August 1932
|- bgcolor="#FFFFFF"
| 
| 12.4 (76)
| 
| 10.12 (72)
| MCG
| 6,486
| 6 August 1932
|- bgcolor="#FFFFFF"
| 
| 15.19 (109)
| 
| 13.18 (96)
| Junction Oval
| 10,000
| 6 August 1932
|- bgcolor="#FFFFFF"
| 
| 12.17 (89)
| 
| 10.8 (68)
| Arden Street Oval
| 6,000
| 6 August 1932

Round 15

|-
! Home team
! Home team score
! Away team
! Away team score
! Venue
! Crowd
! Date
|- bgcolor="#FFFFFF"
| 
| 15.14 (104)
| 
| 5.13 (43)
| Corio Oval
| 6,000
| 13 August 1932
|- bgcolor="#FFFFFF"
| 
| 14.13 (97)
| 
| 8.10 (58)
| Windy Hill
| 10,000
| 13 August 1932
|- bgcolor="#FFFFFF"
| 
| 9.13 (67)
| 
| 4.11 (35)
| Lake Oval
| 15,000
| 13 August 1932
|- bgcolor="#FFFFFF"
| 
| 9.11 (65)
| 
| 8.12 (60)
| Punt Road Oval
| 25,000
| 13 August 1932
|- bgcolor="#FFFFFF"
| 
| 11.13 (79)
| 
| 12.26 (98)
| Brunswick Street Oval
| 12,500
| 13 August 1932
|- bgcolor="#FFFFFF"
| 
| 8.14 (62)
| 
| 12.12 (84)
| Glenferrie Oval
| 9,000
| 13 August 1932

Round 16

|-
! Home team
! Home team score
! Away team
! Away team score
! Venue
! Crowd
! Date
|- bgcolor="#FFFFFF"
| 
| 14.9 (93)
| 
| 16.22 (118)
| MCG
| 7,246
| 20 August 1932
|- bgcolor="#FFFFFF"
| 
| 6.9 (45)
| 
| 16.16 (112)
| Glenferrie Oval
| 10,000
| 20 August 1932
|- bgcolor="#FFFFFF"
| 
| 13.12 (90)
| 
| 11.20 (86)
| Windy Hill
| 15,000
| 20 August 1932
|- bgcolor="#FFFFFF"
| 
| 10.5 (65)
| 
| 9.17 (71)
| Junction Oval
| 13,000
| 20 August 1932
|- bgcolor="#FFFFFF"
| 
| 25.18 (168)
| 
| 8.6 (54)
| Corio Oval
| 6,500
| 20 August 1932
|- bgcolor="#FFFFFF"
| 
| 11.13 (79)
| 
| 17.23 (125)
| Victoria Park
| 33,000
| 20 August 1932

Round 17

|-
! Home team
! Home team score
! Away team
! Away team score
! Venue
! Crowd
! Date
|- bgcolor="#FFFFFF"
| 
| 14.21 (105)
| 
| 13.7 (85)
| Arden Street Oval
| 7,000
| 27 August 1932
|- bgcolor="#FFFFFF"
| 
| 15.15 (105)
| 
| 9.9 (63)
| Princes Park
| 12,000
| 27 August 1932
|- bgcolor="#FFFFFF"
| 
| 24.13 (157)
| 
| 4.10 (34)
| Lake Oval
| 10,000
| 27 August 1932
|- bgcolor="#FFFFFF"
| 
| 13.8 (86)
| 
| 9.20 (74)
| Punt Road Oval
| 26,000
| 27 August 1932
|- bgcolor="#FFFFFF"
| 
| 12.17 (89)
| 
| 7.10 (52)
| Brunswick Street Oval
| 10,000
| 27 August 1932
|- bgcolor="#FFFFFF"
| 
| 9.12 (66)
| 
| 11.5 (71)
| Western Oval
| 15,000
| 27 August 1932

Round 18

|-
! Home team
! Home team score
! Away team
! Away team score
! Venue
! Crowd
! Date
|- bgcolor="#FFFFFF"
| 
| 17.23 (125)
| 
| 9.15 (69)
| Corio Oval
| 9,500
| 3 September 1932
|- bgcolor="#FFFFFF"
| 
| 9.10 (64)
| 
| 12.18 (90)
| Western Oval
| 11,000
| 3 September 1932
|- bgcolor="#FFFFFF"
| 
| 10.7 (67)
| 
| 14.11 (95)
| Brunswick Street Oval
| 14,000
| 3 September 1932
|- bgcolor="#FFFFFF"
| 
| 11.15 (81)
| 
| 4.10 (34)
| Windy Hill
| 7,000
| 3 September 1932
|- bgcolor="#FFFFFF"
| 
| 13.12 (90)
| 
| 16.17 (113)
| MCG
| 10,698
| 3 September 1932
|- bgcolor="#FFFFFF"
| 
| 7.12 (54)
| 
| 20.21 (141)
| Junction Oval
| 15,000
| 3 September 1932

Ladder

Finals

Semi finals

|-
! Home team
! Score
! Away team
! Score
! Venue
! Crowd
! Date
|- bgcolor="#FFFFFF"
| Collingwood
| 17.12 (114)
| South Melbourne
| 12.16 (88)
| MCG
| 51,209
| 10 September
|- bgcolor="#FFFFFF"
| 
| 14.15 (99)
| 
| 18.16 (124)
| MCG
| 63.326
| 17 September

Preliminary Final

|-
! Home team
! Score
! Away team
! Score
! Venue
! Crowd
! Date
|- bgcolor="#FFFFFF"
| 
| 23.19 (157)
| Collingwood
| 11.16 (82)
| MCG
| 46,447
| 24 September

Grand final

Richmond defeated Carlton 13.14 (92) to 12.11 (83), in front of a crowd of 69,724 people. (For an explanation of scoring see Australian rules football).

Awards
 The 1932 VFL Premiership team was Richmond.
 The VFL's leading goalkicker was George Moloney of Geelong with 109 goals (all scored during the home-and-away season).
 The winner of the 1932 Brownlow Medal was Haydn Bunton, Sr of Fitzroy with 23 votes.
 Hawthorn took the "wooden spoon" in 1932.
Melbourne 8.12 (60) defeated  4.10 (34) in the Grand Final, played as a curtain-raiser to the firsts Grand Final on 1 October at the Melbourne Cricket Ground.

Notable events
 Rain had delayed the resurfacing of the Melbourne Cricket Ground, so  arranged to play its first three matches for the year at the Motordrome. These were the only three VFL matches ever staged at the venue.
 In round 11, due to the effects of an extremely strong cross-wind that blew all day at the Lake Oval, the up-to-that-time-unbeaten South Melbourne lost to Collingwood, kicking 5.17 (47) to their opponent's more accurate 7.8 (50).
 After the match was over, it was revealed that Richmond wingman Alan Geddes had played the entire second half of the Grand-Final with a broken jaw.

References  

 Hogan, P., The Tigers of Old, The Richmond Football Club, (Richmond), 1996. 
 Rogers, S. & Brown, A., Every Game Ever Played: VFL/AFL Results 1897–1997 (Sixth Edition), Viking Books, (Ringwood), 1998. 
 Ross, J. (ed), 100 Years of Australian Football 1897–1996: The Complete Story of the AFL, All the Big Stories, All the Great Pictures, All the Champions, Every AFL Season Reported, Viking, (Ringwood), 1996.

External links
 1932 Season - AFL Tables

Australian Football League seasons
Vfl season